Nicolaie Taga (born 12 April 1967) is a retired Romanian rower. He competed in three events at the 1992 and 1996 Olympics and won a gold and a bronze medal in 1992. At the world championships he won a gold medal in 1993 followed by two silvers and two bronzes in 1996–2000.

References

1967 births
Living people
Romanian male rowers
Rowers at the 1992 Summer Olympics
Rowers at the 1996 Summer Olympics
Olympic rowers of Romania
Olympic gold medalists for Romania
Olympic bronze medalists for Romania
Olympic medalists in rowing
Medalists at the 1992 Summer Olympics
World Rowing Championships medalists for Romania